Tamaz Mechiauri (1 December 1954 – 15 February 2022) was a Georgian politician, engineer, and economist.

Early life and education
Mechiauri was born on 1 December 1954, in the village of Zhebota, in the Tianeti district of the Georgian SSR. He graduated from Tbilisi Komarov Physics and Mathematics Boarding School, then Tbilisi State University, Faculty of Engineering and Economics.

Career 
In 1995, Mechiauri was elected as a member of the Parliament of Georgia and served until 2004. He was later elected again to the Parliament of Georgia, for Georgian Dream, and served from 2012 till 2016.  

Mechiauri left Georgian Dream in 2016 due to disagreements, and founded the party "For United Georgia", which he led before death. 

In 2017, he was elected Mayor of Tianeti., but later resigned due to his participation in the parliamentary elections in 2020. 

He died from complications of COVID-19 on 15 February 2022, at the age of 67.

References

1954 births
2022 deaths
21st-century politicians from Georgia (country)
Deaths from the COVID-19 pandemic in Georgia (country)
Members of the Parliament of Georgia
People from Mtskheta-Mtianeti
Georgian Dream politicians